Nassau County is the northeasternmost county of the U.S. state of Florida. According to the 2020 United States Census, the county's population was 90,352.

The county seat and the largest incorporated city is Fernandina Beach. Nassau County is part of the Jacksonville metropolitan area, which was home to 1,534,701 people in 2018. Population growth in the county has increased by over 28,000 residents since the year 2000 as a result of Nassau's proximity to downtown Jacksonville, new housing developments, agricultural production, tourism locations, and a diversifying tax base with new industrial and commercial companies moving to the county. Nassau County is also a popular choice of residence for military personnel stationed on bases in neighboring Duval County, Florida (Naval Air Station Jacksonville, Naval Station Mayport) and Camden County, Georgia (Naval Submarine Base Kings Bay).

History

Nassau County was created in 1824 from Duval County. It was named for the Duchy of Nassau in Germany.

The Battle of Alligator Bridge took place in Nassau County around Callahan on June 30, 1778, and was the only major engagement in an unsuccessful campaign to conquer British East Florida during the American Revolutionary War.

In 1817, the short-lived Republic of the Floridas was established on Amelia Island. It was one of several attempts to wrestle Florida from Spanish control into the growing United States.

Law and government

The main environmental and agricultural body is the Nassau County Soil and Water Conservation District, which works closely with other area agencies.

County Commissioners

Nassau County is governed by the five-member Nassau County Board of County Commissioners, who are elected to four-year terms by the voters. The terms are staggered so that either three or two commissioners (alternately) are up for election every two years.
The Nassau County Commissioners consists of the five members below:

Ocean Highway & Port Authority

The Ocean Highway & Port Authority (OHPA) is the independent government agency in Nassau County, Florida, that owns and operates the seaport system at the Port of Fernandina.  OHPA was founded in 1941 by the Florida Legislature.

The Port of Fernandina is used for terminal service for pulp and paper as well as steel exports, machinery, auto parts, chemicals, beverages, chemicals, building materials and food products. Container lines from the port serve routes to Colombia, Venezuela, the Dominican Republic, Haiti, Jamaica, Aruba, Curaçao, and Bermuda. In 2020 the port received over a million dollar grant from the United States Department of Transportation to start a barge service.

OHPA Commissioners
 District 1: Miriam Hill
 District 2: Danny Fullwood (Chair)
 District 3: Scott Hanna
 District 4: Carrol Franklin
 District 5: Michael Cole

Police
The Nassau County Sheriff's Office provides services for the citizens of Nassau County. The Office of the Sheriff has a duty to enforce both the Florida Constitution and Florida state laws and statutes, and to provide for the security, safety and well-being of its citizens. This is accomplished through the delivery of law enforcement services, the operation of the Nassau County Jail and Detention Center, and the provision of court security. The Nassau County Sheriff's Office Headquarters is in Yulee.  the Sheriff is Bill Leeper.

Court Houses
The Nassau County Courthouse in Fernandina Beach is a historic two-story red brick courthouse built in 1891.

The Robert M. Foster Justice Center is in Yulee. It was opened in 2004 to augment the historic Nassau County Courthouse location. This facility contains over 111,000 square feet and cost over $20 million to build.

Climate
Like much of the south Atlantic region of the United States, Nassau County has a humid subtropical climate (Köppen Cfa), with mild weather during winters and hot and humid weather during summers. Seasonal rainfall is concentrated in the warmest months from May through September, while the driest months are from November through April. Due to Yulee's low latitude and proximity to the coast it allows for very little cold weather, and winters are typically mild and sunny.

Geography
The city of Fernandina Beach is on Amelia Island, the county's one inhabited island. Fernandina Beach municipality extends across the Intracoastal Waterway along A1A to Yulee.

Topography

There are 12 distinct topographical zones in Nassau County. Most of these zones run in narrow bands stretching from north to south, although this is less true as one approaches the Atlantic coast.
 Directly against the western border with Baker County, the topography ranges from fairly flat to slightly elevated. Drainage is poor and the soil is sandy.
 Moving east, there are some areas (mostly in the northern and central county) of higher ground with much better drainage.
 East of these areas are some lower places, especially in the south, that are level and have extremely poor drainage.
 Eastward again, there is a stretch that ranges from a few miles in the extreme northern areas to about 6- wide in the southern area, including Hilliard and much of County Road 108 and State Road 301. This area again has very poor drainage, low-lying land, and fairly sandy soil.
 East of this are scattered areas of high, sandy land with spotty or poor drainage.
 East of this, there is an area including Callahan with very sandy soil on top, and clay underneath. This section of the county is heavily permeated by small creeks and rivers, which bring with them low, poorly drained soils.
The land is low and level with extremely poor drainage, and it is permeated by small creeks and rivers. In the northern section, this is where some tributaries join the St. Marys River, while in the south a number of tributaries drain into the Nassau River, which flows into the Nassau Sound and the Atlantic Ocean.
 To the south is an area of low-lying, organic soils which are essentially marshes and wetlands along the northern bank of the Nassau River, continuing into the Nassau Sound.
 Still eastward and somewhat to the north is a large area of marshes and organic soils which characterize area wetlands. There are many small islands in this area, and it is permeated by the Bells River and Jolly River, which empty into the Cumberland Sound to the north, just below Cumberland Island.
 Amelia Island, the easternmost section of the county, is characterized by poor drainage in the west and better drained, higher, sandier land as one travels eastward towards the beach. The northern area of the island features salty marshlands surrounding Egan's Creek, which runs directly beneath Atlantic Boulevard in Fernandina Beach.

Adjacent counties
 Camden County, Georgia – north
 Duval County – south/east
 Baker County – southwest
 Charlton County, Georgia – west

Transportation

Airports
 Fernandina Beach Municipal Airport
 Hilliard Airpark

Major highways

  Interstate 95
  Interstate 10
  US 1
  US 17
  US 23
  US 90
  US 301
  SR A1A
  SR 2
  SR 15A
  CR 108
  SR 115
  CR 119
  SR 200

Demographics

As of the 2020 United States census, there were 90,352 people, 33,475 households, and 24,357 families residing in the county.

As of the census of 2000, there were 57,663 people, 21,980 households, and 16,528 families residing in the county. The population density was 34/km2 (88/sq mi). There were 25,917 housing units at an average density of 15/km2 (40/sq mi). The racial makeup of the county was 90.0% White, 7.7% Black or African American, 0.4% Native American, 0.5% Asian, <0.1% Pacific Islander, 0.3% from other races, and 1.0% from two or more races. 1.5% of the population were Hispanic or Latino of any race.

According to the 2000 Census, the largest European ancestry groups in Nassau County were: English (36.2%), Irish (13.6%) and German (11.7%).

There were 21,980 households, out of which 32.8% had children under the age of 18 living with them, 61.2% were married couples living together, 9.9% had a female householder with no husband present, and 24.80% were non-families. 20.1% of all households were made up of individuals, and 7.7% had someone living alone who was 65 years of age or older. The average household size was 2.59 and the average family size was 2.97.

In the county, the population was spread out, with 25.0% under the age of 18, 7.2% from 18 to 24, 28.8% from 25 to 44, 26.3% from 45 to 64, and 12.6% who were 65 years of age or older. The median age was 38 years. For every 100 females there were 97.3 males. For every 100 females age 18 and over, there were 94.8 males.

As of 2021, the median income for a household in the county was $64,943. The per capita income for the county was $36,553. About 8.1% of the population were below the poverty line.

Economy

Nassau County's economy is very diverse, ranging from agricultural activity (mostly in the form of tree farms) in the west and central areas, to a variety of activities closer to Amelia Island. Much of the land used for tree farming is owned by Rayonier, a major employer in the area, and the owner of a large pulp mill in Fernandina Beach. Historically, tree farming, trucking, and pulp production have characterized a large portion of the local economy. However, extensive growth is occurring in the outlying small towns in the rural western area, and the home construction market is still quite strong. Fernandina Beach has long been known for professional industries such as real estate, legal services, and medical care, and is also the closest city to two upscale resorts: the Ritz-Carlton Hotel and Amelia Island Plantation. In the central area of the county, a private tract of land known as the White Oak Conservation was once owned by a wealthy family who ran the area as a private zoo, complete with exotic animals such as giraffes and large albino cats. Numerous public figures, including former President Bill Clinton, have traveled to the resort in the past as a vacation spot.

Nassau County has several outdoor festivals and events.

The Nassau County Economic Development Board, which represents all of Nassau County as a desirable place to relocate a business or to expand a business. In November 2017 it was announced that the University of Florida will be building two health and fitness facilities. In January 2018 the large energy company Florida Public Utilities announced that they will be relocating to Yulee and will be building a new  corporate headquarters.

In 2017 Rayonier completed building a new corporate headquarters in Yulee. Rayonier also plans to develop a  pine forest in Yulee into a community complete with housing, offices, medical facilities, shopping centers, light industrial facilities and schools. Rayonier is also working with Nassau County to develop the Wildlight Elementary School at a cost of $26 million which is scheduled to open for the start of the 2017–2018 academic year with 600 students.

It is designated as a reliever airport for Jacksonville International Airport.

Hilliard is home to a Federal Aviation Administration (FAA) Air Traffic Control Center, which coordinates most commercial and civilian air traffic for the southeastern United States. The FAA center is a major employer in Hilliard and there are many retired FAA employees who live in Nassau County.

The Florida Welcome Center in the county is a "tourist information house", near the Florida/Georgia state line on I-95. This center provides incoming visitors with a variety of information on travel, highways, sports, climate, accommodations, cities, outdoor recreation, and attractions. In tribute to the citrus industry (which historically has been a major part of Florida's economy), every visitor is offered a free cup of Florida citrus juice (orange or grapefruit).

Top employers
According to the Nassau County website as of June 2019, the top employers in the county are:

Education

Public – Nassau County School District
Nassau County Public School District operates public schools. Its schools are below:

Elementary schools:
 Bryceville Elementary (K-5) – Bryceville
 Callahan Elementary (PreK-2) – Callahan
 Callahan Intermediate (3–5) – Callahan
 Emma Love Hardee Elementary (3–5) – Fernandina Beach
 Hilliard Elementary (PreK-5) – Hilliard
 Southside Elementary (PreK-2) – Fernandina Beach
 Yulee Elementary (3–5) – Yulee
 Yulee Primary (PreK-2) – Yulee
 Wildlight Elementary (K-5) – Wildlight

Middle schools:
 Callahan Middle (6–8) (Mascot: Ramblers) – Callahan
 Fernandina Beach Middle (6–8) (Mascot: Pirates) – Fernandina Beach
 Yulee Middle (6–8) (Mascot: Hornets) – Yulee

High schools:
 Fernandina Beach High (9–12) (Mascot: Pirates) – Fernandina Beach
 West Nassau High (9–12) (Mascot: Warriors) – Callahan
 Yulee High (9–12) (Mascot: Hornets) – Yulee

Middle-senior high schools:
 Hilliard Middle-Senior High (6–12) (Mascot: Red Flashes ) – Hilliard

Private schools
 Amelia Island Montessori ( Pre Kindergarten-8) – Fernandina Beach
 Faith Christian Academy (Pre- Kindergarten-12) – Fernandina Beach 
 Fernandina Beach Christian Academy ( Kindergarten-5th (2015)) – Fernandina Beach
 Nassau Christian School ( Pre Kindergarten-12) – Yulee
 St. Michaels Academy (Pre Kindergarten-8) – Fernandina Beach
 Sonshine Christian School( Pre Kindergarten-12) – Callahan

Higher education
Florida State College at Jacksonville, a state college in the Florida College System, has a campus in Nassau County near Yulee called the Betty Cook Center. It is accredited by the Southern Association of Colleges and Schools to award associates degrees and bachelor's degrees.

Libraries
The Nassau County Public Library has 5 branches.

A major renovation of the Fernandina Beach branch was completed in 2015 and a grand opening of the branch was held in April, 2016. Per the Nassau County Public Library's long range plan for 2013–2017, this renovation brought that building, originally opened in 1976, up to current Nassau County code. A resolution between the City of Fernandina Beach and Nassau County was also passed that details the ownership of the Library facility and Library operations.
The Fernandina Beach branch also houses over one thousand titles that belong to the Amelia Island Genealogical Society. The materials are available for public use at the library.
 Bryceville
 Callahan
 Fernandina Beach 
 Hilliard
 Yulee

Media
There are three newspapers in Nassau County. The largest, the Fernandina Beach News-Leader, is owned by Community Newspapers Incorporated, a media company headed by Tom Wood and Dink NeSmith. The Nassau County Record is also owned by Community Newspapers Incorporated. Both of these periodicals are available by subscription or from newsstands. The Westside Journal, an independent newspaper, is published by Florida Sun Printing, and is available for free through the mail and usually features submitted copy.

Municipalities and Communities

City
 Fernandina Beach
Amelia City
 American Beach

Towns
 Callahan
 Hilliard
 Andrews

Census-designated places
 Nassau Village-Ratliff
 Yulee

Other unincorporated communities

 Amelia City
 American Beach
 Andrews
 Becker
 Boulogne
 Bryceville
 Chester
 Crandall
 Crawford
 Dahoma
 Dyal
 Evergreen
 Franklintown
 Glenwood
 Gross
 Hedges
 Hero
 Ingle
 Italia
 Keene
 Kent
 Kings Ferry
 Lessie
 Mattox
 Nassauville
 O'Neil
 Verdie
 Yulee Heights

Gallery of Municipalities and Communities

Politics

Notable people

 William B. Allen, political scientist who was chairman of the United States Commission on Civil Rights from 1988 to 1989, was born in Fernandina Beach in 1944.
 Kris Anderson – National Basketball Association player with the Milwaukee Bucks
 Raymond A. Brown, attorney whose clients included Black Liberation Army member Assata Shakur, boxer Rubin "Hurricane" Carter and "Dr. X" physician Mario Jascalevich.
 George Crady – Former member of the Florida House of Representatives
 Kyle Denney – Major League Baseball catcher
 Ben "Bubba" Dickerson, professional golfer.
 John M. Drew – tax collector
 George Rainsford Fairbanks, a Confederate major in the U.S. Civil War, he was also a historian, lawyer and Florida state senator. The Fairbanks House is listed on the NRHP and is operated as a bed and breakfast lodging establishment.
 Joseph Finegan, businessman, Brigadier general for the Confederate States Army; resident of Fernandina Beach.
 Derrick Henry – football, 2015 Heisman Trophy Winner running back at Alabama, and the Tennessee Titans
 Howie Kendrick, Major League Baseball player for the Anaheim Angels
 Frank Murphy Jr former NFL football player for the Chicago Bears, Tampa Bay Buccaneers, Houston Texans and Miami Dolphins.
 Apple Pope – American rugby league player who plays for the United States national rugby league team
 Tom Schwartz – Entrepreneur, model-actor and star of Bravo's 'Vanderpump Rules'
 D. J. Stewart – baseball left fielder at Florida State University
 Rick Stockstill, football head coach at Middle Tennessee; raised in Fernandina Beach.
 Zack Taylor – Major League Baseball player and manager for the St. Louis Browns
 Daniel Thomas, National Football League player for the Miami Dolphins
 David Levy Yulee, Florida Territorial representative to Congress and the first U.S. senator from Florida when it became a state, member of the Confederate Congress, builder of Florida's first cross-state railroad (Fernandina to Cedar Key). There is a statue of David Yulee in Fernandina Beach.

Historic places

 Amelia Island Light
 American Beach Historic District
 Bailey House
 Ervin's Rest
 Fairbanks House
 Fernandina Beach Historic District
 Fort Clinch State Park
 Hippard House
 Historic Nassau County Courthouse
 Merrick-Simmons House
 Mount Olive Missionary Baptist Church
 Amelia Island Museum of History
 Original Town of Fernandina Historic Site
 John Denham Palmer House
 Tabby House
 US Post Office, Custom and Court House

See also
 National Register of Historic Places listings in Nassau County, Florida

Notes

References

Further reading
 Jan H. Johannes, Yesterday's Reflections, (1976, 1984)
 Jan H. Johannes, Yesterday's Reflections II, (2000) 
 Jan H. Johannes, Tidewater Amelia: Historic homes & buildings of Amelia Island, Cumberland Island, St. Marys, Fort George Island, (2002)

External links

Economy
 Amelia Island Plantation
 Federal Aviation Administration Air Route Traffic Control Center ZJX
 Rayonier
 The Ritz Carlton

Local media
 Fernandina Beach News-Leader
 Nassau County Record
 Florida Times-Union in Nassau County

Cultural
 Amelia Island Genealogical Society
 Nassau County Writers and Poets Society
 Fort Clinch

Government links/Constitutional offices
 Nassau County Government official website for County Government
 Nassau County Clerk of Courts
 Nassau County Board of County Commissioners 
 Nassau County Supervisor of Elections
 Nassau County Property Appraiser
 Nassau County Sheriff's Office 
 Nassau County Public Library 
 Nassau County Tax Collector

Special districts
 Nassau County School District
 St. Johns River Water Management District
 Nassau County Economic Development Board 
 Nassau County Soil and Water Conservation District

Judicial branch
 Public Defender, 4th Judicial Circuit of Florida serving Duval, Clay, and Nassau counties
 Office of the State Attorney, 4th Judicial Circuit of Florida
 Circuit and County Court, 4th Judicial Circuit of Florida

 
Florida counties
1824 establishments in Florida Territory
Populated places established in 1824
Counties in the Jacksonville metropolitan area
North Florida